The common name star gooseberry actually refers to two distinct species of plant:

Phyllanthus acidus, the Otaheite gooseberry
Sauropus androgynus, the katuk